Presidential elections were held in Bulgaria on 22 October 2006, as decided on 27 July 2006 by the Bulgarian Parliament. The runoff took place on 29 October 2006, while the electoral campaign spanned 19 September – 20 October. At the election, Georgi Parvanov won his second and final term as President of Bulgaria.

Some of the right-wing parties were disunited at the time but still chose to support a common candidate, Nedelcho Beronov. Prime minister and head of the Socialist Party Sergey Stanishev expressed his strong support for the current president, Georgi Parvanov, in July 2006, and Parvanov officially stated his desire to run for a second term on 25 August 2006. He was also backed by the other two members of the then ruling Triple coalition – NDSV and DPS.

In the first round, incumbent Georgi Parvanov received 64% of the vote, ahead of nationalist leader Volen Siderov who came second with 21.5%. However, Parvanov was forced into a runoff with Siderov, as Bulgarian law requires a turnout of 50% for a president to be elected in the first round. Turnout for the first round was 42.51%.
The defeated right-wing forces called for abstention, while some far-left formations expressed their support for Siderov.

The second round saw Parvanov win a decisive victory with 75.9% as opposed to Siderov's 24.1%, meaning that Parvanov became the first person to be democratically re-elected as President of Bulgaria. The turnout was 41.21%.

Results

See also
President of Bulgaria
Politics of Bulgaria

References and notes

External links
 Izbori2006.org – official Central Electoral Commission website for the election 
 Focus News' Elections 2006 section

Presidential elections in Bulgaria
Bulgaria
Presidential election
October 2006 events in Europe